Move is the second Korean studio album by South Korean singer Taemin. The album consists of nine tracks including the title track, "Move". It was released digitally and physically on October 16, 2017, through SM Entertainment and distributed by Genie Music. A Korean version of Taemin's Japanese single, "Flame of Love", also appears on the album. The album was re-released under the title Move-ing on December 10, 2017.

Background and release
On September 28, 2017, SM Entertainment announced Taemin's second Korean studio album for October 16, 2017. Prior to the release of the album, Taemin previewed the songs from Move at his first Korean concert, titled Off-Sick, on October 15, 2017 in front of 10,000 fans. The album was released a day later on October 16, 2017 through various music sites and contained a total of nine tracks. Its lead single, "Move", was accompanied by three different music videos—the first was the official music video for the song that featured the singer in a variety of scenes, while the second and third videos focused on the choreography itself; the latter featured Japanese choreographer Koharu Sugawara. The album also included "Heart Stop", a light-hearted duet with labelmate Red Velvet's Seulgi, and a Korean version of Taemin's second Japanese single "Flame of Love", previously released on July 18, 2017.

On December 5, it was reported that a repackaged edition of the album, titled Move-ing, would be released on December 10. Move-ing contained four additional tracks, including the single "Day and Night".

Singles
"Move" was not supposed to be the album's original promotional track, as the company had chosen the album's B-side "Love" instead. However, Taemin decided against the song, since he did not think it would allow him to show his true identity. He aimed to break gender stereotypes and the perceived limits of K-pop's artistry and worked with the Japanese choreographer Koharu Sugawara and a team of female dancers to create the choreography for the song with the intentional to use Taemin's soft frame as a starting point to counter the gender norms typified by many K-pop dances, stating: 
My aim was to find a middle ground, mixing both masculine and feminine movements into the choreography together. My body shape is like that of a dancer’s, it’s not too masculine or overly muscular and I wanted to take advantage of that. I thought I could show the soft lines like the dance movements of a ballet dancer by adding subtlety to my choreography. I wanted to break the idea of what male performers are supposed to show, what performances girl groups are supposed to show. I really wanted to break those labels, showing that dance is a form of art.
He also explained putting out three different music videos at once was something he wanted to try in order to show the different elements of the choreography as well as a strategical decision to make the choreography seem both possible and impossible at the same time and that he wanted to focus on bringing nuances into the music rather than having big movements. Taemin also appeared at the Seoul Fashion Week in October 2017 to perform "Move", which was named as a standout moment of the season of Seoul Fashion Week by W Magazine writer Todd Plummer.

Accolades

Track listing

Charts

Weekly charts

Monthly charts

Release history

References

External links
 
 
 

2017 albums
Taemin albums
SM Entertainment albums